Methanetellurol is the organotellurium compound with the formula CH3TeH. It is the simplest organotellurium compound that has been purified in bulk. It is classified as a tellurol. A colorless gas, it decomposes to Te and methane near room temperature.  It is prepared by reduction of dimethyl ditelluride using Na/NH3 followed by protonation of the NaTeCH3 with sulfuric acid.  Few publications describe this compound as a consequence of its instability and paucity of applications.

According to IR spectroscopy, νTe-H = 1995 cm−1.  For the lighter homologues, νE-H = 2342 (E = Se), 2606 (E = S), and 3710 cm−1 (E = O) for methaneselenol, methanethiol, and methanol.

References

Organotellurium compounds
Hydrides
Organic compounds with 1 carbon atom